The Association of Specialized, Government, and Cooperative Library Agencies (ASGCLA) is a defunct division of the American Library Association (ALA), which is the oldest and largest library association in the world. The ALA Council in June 2020 voted to dissolve ASGCLA and assign its components to other units within ALA and it ceased to exist on September 1, 2020.

History

In 1977, two ALA divisions, the American Association of State Library Agencies (founded in 1957) and the Health and Rehabilitative Library Services Division (founded in 1956 as the Association of Hospital and Institution Libraries) merged and took on the name ASCLA. The independent librarians joined ASCLA in 1998 when their ALA round table, Independent Librarians’ Exchange Round Table (ILERT), voted to merge with the division. In the election of 2017, the Federal and Armed Forces Libraries Round Table (FAFLRT) voted to merge into ASCLA. In the ALA elections of 2018, the name was voted to be changed from Association of Specialized, and Cooperative Library Agencies (ASCLA) to implement the merger with the former Federal and Armed Forces Librarians Round Table.

The Association of Hospital and Institution Libraries included the former Division of Hospital Libraries and the former Institution Libraries Committee. The Division of Hospital Libraries was established by Council in 1944, following a petition by 300 ALA members. The Division replaced the Hospital Libraries Round Table, and formed the beginnings of the new division, which was authorized by Council in June 1956.

The State Library Agencies Division became a division of ALA on January 1, 1957. It was created out of the Committee on State Library Agencies. The Committee on State Library Agencies had been established by the Executive Board, January 1950, with a charge to "outline a proposal for a study of state library agencies as a basis for setting standards and strengthening services." The officers of the National Association of State Libraries constituted the Organizing Committee of the State Library Agencies Division.

In 1958 the National Association of State Libraries, founded in 1889, disbanded. Its membership merged with that of the American Association of State Libraries (AASL), a division of ALA since January 1, 1957. The State Library Agencies Division (SLAD) was founded on January 1, 1957  and in 1958 SLAD merged with the AASL to become the State Library Agency Division and AASL changed its title to the Association of Specialized and Cooperative Library Agencies (ASCLA).)

In June 2020, the ALA Council voted to dissolve the division, effective September 1, due to the ALA's financial difficulties and ASGCLA's "falling membership and revenues." The dissolution took effect on September 1, 2020.

ASGCLA was responsible for functions pertaining to library services performed by state library agencies, specialized library agencies, and mutitype library cooperatives. It had the specific responsibility for: 
 Synthesis of appropriate ALA unit activities with the development and evaluation of programs which extend and improve user services in state and specialized libraries and multitype library cooperatives. 
 Representation and interpretation of the roles, functions, and services of these types of libraries within and outside the profession. 
 Development of policies, studies, and activities relative to government funding, grants and appropriations, and inter-governmental relationships in matters which affect these types of libraries, coordinated with appropriate ALA unit archives.
 Establishment, evaluation, and promotion of standards.
 Identification of user needs, and the creation and promotion of services to meet those needs.
 Stimulation of the development and participation in appropriate type-of-activity divisions of librarians engaged in these types of libraries.
 Coordination of the activities of ALA units which have a bearing on the concerns of this association.
 Granting recognition for outstanding library service enacted.
 Disseminating information and stimulating publishing and research.

ASGCLA was governed by an Executive Committee and a Board. The Executive Committee included the president, the vice-president/president-elect, the secretary, the past-president, and the ALA divisional councilor. The executive committee was responsible for management of the Association between Annual and Midwinter meetings of ALA. The Association executive director was an ex officio member of the Executive Committee. All decisions of the Executive Committee were reported to the Board of Directors.

The Board of Directors consisted of the officers, the ALA divisional councilor, and eight directors, five of whom were designated directors. The five (5) designated directors represented the types of library organizations and agencies: state library agencies (1), library agencies and individuals who serve special populations (2), library cooperatives (1), armed forces libraries (1), federal libraries (1), and independent librarians (1).
The executive director and the editor of the Association publication served as ex officio non-voting members of the Board. Other non-voting members may have been appointed by the president, with approval of the Board of Directors.

Committees

ASGCLA had the following committees:
 Accessibility Assembly
 Awards Committee
 Board of Directors
 Conference Programming Committee
 Executive Committee
 Finance and Planning Committee
 Guidelines for Library & Information Services for the American Deaf Community
 Interest Group Coordinating Committee
 Membership Committee
 Nominating Committee
 Online Learning Committee
 President's Program Planning Committee
 Publications Committee [currently inactive]
 Web Presence Committee

Interest Groups

ASGCLA Interest Groups were virtual groups hosted on ALA Connect, the active online member community site of ALA. Each community came together to share knowledge and enthusiasm for a specific subject and made valuable contributions to ASGCLA and its core interests of strengthening the usefulness, efficiency and services of:
 Library agencies and individuals which provide library materials and service to populations with special needs, such as those with sensory, physical, health or behavioral conditions or those who are incarcerated or detained
 State library agencies, which are state organizations created to promote library services in the state through a variety of library services
 Library cooperatives, which are combinations, mergers, or contractual associations of one or more types of libraries
 Independent librarians who work outside of traditional library settings

List of ASGCLA Interest Groups
Alzheimer's & Related Dementias Interest Group
Armed Forces Librarian Interest Group
Bridging Deaf Cultures @ your library
Collaborative Digitization Interest Group
Consortial eBooks Interest Group
Consortium Management Interest Group
Consumer Health Information Librarians Interest Group
Federal Librarian Interest Group
Future of Libraries
Library Consultants Interest Group
Library Services to the Incarcerated and Detained
Library Services to Persons with Print Disabilities
Library Services for Youth in Custody
LSTA Coordinators Interest Group
Physical Delivery Interest Group
State Library Agencies – Library Development Interest Group
State Library Agencies – Youth Services Consultants
Tribal Librarians Interest Group
Universal Access Interest Group

Elected Leaders: Presidents and Councilors

ASGCLA Presidents
 1978-79    Phyllis I. Dalton
 1979-80    Edward Seidenberg
 1980-81    Carmela M. Ruby
 1981-82    Anne Marie Falsone
 1982-83    Nancy L. Wareham
 1983-84    Christine L. Kirby
 1984-85    James A. Nelson
 1985-86    Gail J. McGovern
 1986-87    Bridget Lamont
 1987-88    Lorraine D. Summers
 1988-89    Joseph F. Shubert
 1989-90    William G. Asp
 1990-91    Clarence R. Walters
 1991-92    Duane F. Johnson
 1992-93    Janice Beck Ison
 1993-94    Barbara L. Perkis
 1994-95    Amy Owen
 1995-96    Leslie B. Burger
 1996-97    Kate F. Nevins
 1997-98    Nancy M. Bolt
 1998-99    John M. Day
 1999-00    Barbara H. Will
 2000-01    Donna Dziedzic
 2001-02    Jerry Krois
 2002-03    Ethel Himmel
 2003-04    Tom W. Sloan
 2004-05    Peggy D. Rudd
 2005-06    Diana M. Paque
 2006-07    Marilyn M. Irwin
 2007-08    Barbara T. Mates
 2008-09    Carol Ann Desch
 2009-10    Brenda Bailey-Hainer
 2010-11    Diana Reese
 2011-12    Norma Blake
 2012-13    Stacey A. Aldrich
 2013-14    Sara Laughlin
 2014-15    Kathleen Ann Moeller-Peiffer
 2015-16    Rhonda Gould
 2016-17    Michael Golrick
 2017-18    Jeannette Smithee
 2018-19    Adam Szczepaniak
 2019-20    Sherry Machones

Division Councilors
 1979-1981    Susan M. Haskin
 1981-1985    Barratt Wilkins    
 1985-1989    Donna Dziedzic
 1989-1993    Suzanne J. Lebarron  
 1993-1997    Lorraine S. Summers
 1997-2001    Jan Ison
 2001-2004    Marilyn M. Irwin
 2004-2007    Cynthia Roach
 2007-2010    Kendall French Wiggin
 2010-2012    Kendall French Wiggin [resigned]
 2012-2015    Liz Bishoff
 2015-2018    Chris Corrigan
 2018-2021    Michael Golrick

Archives
The archives of ASGCLA are in the archives of the American Library Association, housed at the University of Illinois at Urbana-Champaign.

References

American Library Association
Library-related professional associations